Elbow Lake may refer to:

Settlements
 Elbow Lake, Saskatchewan, Canada
 Elbow Lake, Becker County, Minnesota, U.S.
 Elbow Lake, Grant County, Minnesota, U.S.
 Elbow Lake Township, Grant County, Minnesota, U.S.

Lakes
 Elbow Lake (Alberta), Canada
 Elbow Lake (Grant County, Minnesota), U.S.
 Elbow Lake (Thurston County, Washington), U.S.
 Elbow Lake (Saskatchewan), Canada

Other uses
 Elbow Lake Subdivision, a railway line from Glenwood, Minnesota to Enderlin, North Dakota, U.S.

See also
 
 Ellbogensee, a lake in Mecklenburg-Vorpommern, Germany